Tarapacá was a Department of Peru, which existed between 1878 and 1884, when it was unconditionally ceded to Chile after the War of the Pacific under the Treaty of Ancón.

History
The department was located in southern Peru, near the Pacific Ocean. It was limited to the north by the Arica Province within Moquegua Department, in the south and east by Bolivia, and on the west by the Pacific Ocean. The curaca (tribal chief) of the coastal region in Tarapacá of the Kingdom of Chucuito was Felipe Lucaya, until the Spanish conquest.

In 1600, parcels Lluta, Arica, Azapa, Tarapacá were handed over to Pedro Mesia Cordova, who then handed over the valleys of Tácana and Sama.

In 1612 Pope Paolo V authorizes the establishment of the Diocese of Arequipa in which were seven jurisdictions including the district of San Marcos Arica comprising the regions of Tacna, Tarata, Sama, Ilabaya, Locumba, Putina and Tarapacá.

By 1777 the village of Arica was composed of Ilo, Tacna, Arica, Iquique, Pica, Ilabaya, Tarata, Codpa.

In 1837, the Peru–Bolivian Confederation established the  within South Peru, separating the provinces of Tacna and Tarapacá from the "Departamento de la Ley" (i.e. Arequipa).

In 1841, under Agustín Gamarra's second government a war between Peru and Bolivia took place. Gamarra was seeking to annex the former Upper Peru to Lower Peru, but was defeated at the Battle of Ingavi in 1841 by General José Ballivián. Ballivián's troops occupied Puno, Moquegua, Tacna and Tarapacá, until Peruvian José María Lavaysen's troops from Sama defeated the invading army. In Locumba, Colonel Manuel de Mendiburu also organized forces, as well as Justo Arias Aragüez in 1842.

In 1868, Tarapacá Province was separated from the department of Moquegua under the name of "Litoral Province" on December 1.

On August 17, 1878, the Department of Tarapacá was established, replacing the Litoral Province of the same name. After the War of the Pacific, the territory was occupied by Chile, and the Treaty of Ancón was signed on October 20, 1883. The territory was formally integrated into Chile on October 31, 1884.

Administrative divisions
Tarapacá was divided into two provinces:

See also
 Treaty of Ancón
 War of the Pacific
 Tacna Province (Chile)
 Litoral Department

References

External links
En la Memoria y en la Historia, a paper reflecting on the cultural and historical loss that Peru suffered with the territorial loss of Arica, Iquique and Tarapacá.

Former subdivisions of Peru